The  is a 1.4 km light rail line owned by Iyotetsu. The line runs entirely within the city of Matsuyama, Ehime Prefecture, Japan.

Operations
The line is electrified with overhead lines and is double-tracked for the entire line. Three light rail services, along with the heritage railway train Botchan, serve this line.

Stations
: Stations served by the heritage railway train Botchan

References

Railway lines in Japan
Rail transport in Ehime Prefecture
Railway lines opened in 1936